Diego Lasansky (born December 6, 1994, Iowa City, Iowa) is an American artist whose focus is on printmaking, painting, and drawing. He lives in Iowa City, Iowa.

Biography
Diego Lasansky is a painter and printmaker. Prior to his formal college education, Diego Lasansky learned about artistic processes not only from his grandfather, Mauricio Lasansky, but also from his uncles, three of whom are professional artists, William, Leonardo, and Tomas Lasansky. Lasansky’s work is figurative, and, like his grandfather, tends to focus on subjects readily available to him—such as family members—and those of historical and personal significance. Early success came to Diego Lasansky in his series Portrait at Eighteen. This was a series of 50 intaglio self-portraits, all of which were distinguishable from the others. In 2015 the Cedar Rapids Museum of Art published a monograph on Lasansky.

One of his more recent portraits is of Martin Luther as Junker Jörg. This image of Martin Luther was created in the medium of intaglio printmaking and commemorates the 500th year anniversary of the Reformation. This portrait considers the figurative and formal elements of a portrait of Martin Luther prior to him assuming the identity or persona of Junker Jörg as he went into hiding.

Work
In 2014, Lasansky began work on an intaglio print depicting Martin Luther as Junker Jörg. The print depicts Luther as Junker Jörg (translated to Knight George), the persona he adopted during his stay at Wartburg Castle, where he translated the New Testament from Greek into German. In 2016, Lasansky gifted 40 original intaglio prints of Martin Luther to Wartburg College in celebration of the 500th anniversary of the Protestant Reformation. Each copy of Junker Jörg 1521 was created in Lasansky’s studio over a six-month period. The intaglio printmaking process involves etching and engraving on a flat piece of copper.

Personal life
On January 18, 2020 Diego's father Luis Phillip Lasansky son of Mauricio Lasansky, passed away unexpectedly at the age of 65. Phillip was the director of the Lasansky Corporation for more than forty years.

Selected collections
Augsburg University, Minneapolis, Minnesota
Augustana University, Sioux Falls, South Dakota
Bisignano Art Gallery, University of Dubuque, Dubuque, Iowa
Brauer Museum of Art, Valparaiso University, Valparaiso, Indiana
Cedar Rapids Museum of Art, Cedar Rapids, Iowa
China Printmaking Museum, Gulan, Longhua New District, Shenzhen, Guangdong, China
College of Dentistry, University of Iowa, Iowa City, Iowa
Concordia College New York, Bronxville, New York
Concordia Gallery, Concordia University-Saint Paul, St. Paul, Minnesota
Concordia Seminary St. Louis, Missouri
Concordia University Ann Arbor, Ann Arbor, Michigan
Concordia University of Edmonton, Lutheran Seminary, Edmonton, Alberta, Canada
Concordia College Moorhead, Moorhead, Minnesota
Concordia University Wisconsin, Mequon, Wisconsin
Department of Art and Design, College of Humanities, Concordia University, St. Paul, Minnesota
Dubuque Museum of Art, Dubuque, Iowa
Evangelical Lutheran Church in America (ELCA), Churchwide Ministries, Chicago, Illinois
Finlandia University Hancock, Michigan
George R. White Library and Learning Center, Concordia University, Portland, Oregon
Gettysburg College, Gettysburg, Pennsylvania
Gloria Dei Lutheran Church, Iowa City, Iowa
Grand View University, Des Moines, Iowa
Gustavus Adolphus College, St. Peter, Minnesota
Heritage Collection, Augustana Teaching Museum, Augustana College, Rock Island, Illinois
John and Linda Friend Art Gallery, Concordia University Irvine, Irvine, California
Joel and Lila Harnett Print Study Center University of Richmond Museum, Richmond, Virginia
Kristin Wigley-Fleming Fine Arts Gallery, Luther College, Decorah, Iowa
Lenoir–Rhyne University, Hickory, North Carolina
Luther College University of Regina, Regina, Saskatchewan, Canada
Luther Memorials Foundation of Saxony-Anhalt, The Saxony-Anhalt Museum Association, Wittenberg, Germany
Lutheran School of Theology at Chicago, Chicago, Illinois
Lutheran Theological Library, University of Saskatchewan, Saskatoon, Saskatchewan, Canada
Lutheran Theological Seminary at Philadelphia, Philadelphia, Pennsylvania
Lutheran Theological Seminary University of Saskatchewan, Saskatoon, Saskatchewan, Canada
Marxhausen Art Gallery, Concordia University Nebraska, Seward, Nebraska
Mingenback Art Gallery, Bethany College, Lindsborg, Kansas
Newberry College Newberry, South Carolina
Office of the General Secretary, Lutheran World Federation, Geneva, Switzerland
Olin Hall Gallery, Roanoke College, Salem, Virginia
Pacific Lutheran Theological Seminary, Berkeley, California
Pacific Lutheran University, Tacoma, Washington
Snite Museum of Art, University of Notre Dame, Notre Dame, Indiana
Springfield Museum of Art, Wittenberg University, Springfield, Ohio
St. Paul’s Lutheran Church & School, Waverly, Iowa
Stiftung Lutherhaus, Lutherhaus Eisenach, Eisenach, Germany
Susquehanna University, Selinsgrove, Pennsylvania
Texas Lutheran University, Sequin, Texas
Thiel College, Greenville, Pennsylvania
United States Embassy in Latvia, Riga, Latvia
University of Hawaii at Hilo, Hilo, Hawaii
Waldorf University Foundation, Forest City, Iowa
Wartburg College, Waverly, Iowa
Wartburg Theological Seminary, Dubuque, Iowa
William Rolland Gallery of Fine Art, California Lutheran University, Thousand Oaks, California
Wisconsin Evangelical Lutheran Synod, Waukesha, Wisconsin
Wisconsin Lutheran Seminary, Mequon, Wisconsin
Worcester Art Museum, Worcester, Massachusetts
Zion Lutheran Church, Iowa City, Iowa

Notes

Bibliography
Ulmer, Sean M. Diego Lasansky: Paintings, Drawings, Prints. Iowa City, IA: Cedar Rapids Museum of Art, (December 5, 2015).

External links
 Diego Lasansky
 http://www.diegolasansky.com/assets/diego-lasansky-cv-nov.-9%2c-17.pdf /CV 
 Mauricio Lasansky
 Cedar Rapids Museum of Art. Information about the exhibition ''Diego Lasansky: Portrait of the Artist as a young man
 Intersections: Reforming Church and Academy: 500 Years and Counting
 "Portrait of the Reformation", Wartburg Magazine, Wartburg College – pg. 21
 Diego Lasansky A Family Imprint

21st-century American painters
American printmakers
1994 births
Living people
Iowa City West High School alumni